A women-only bank is a financial institution catering exclusively to women.

Development
In 2001, Dubai Islamic Bank opened a women-only bank branch.

Iran opened such a bank in Mashhad on June 7, 2010. The bank's director stated, "the aim is not sex segregation but respect for women." The government-owned bank is Bank Melli.

In Saudi Arabia, most banks have some sort of women-only branch within the main branch. Not necessarily all branches and banks have this. Albeit the main branch can usually be accessed by both men and women.

in 2013, India launched its first public sector bank for women only, in Mumbai, aimed at economically empowering millions of women in India.

See also
Women's rights
Women's World Banking
Women-only space

References

External links
Iran's first women-only bank opens: IRNA

Sex segregation
Banking in Iran
Mashhad
Banking in the United Arab Emirates
Society of the United Arab Emirates
Retailing in Dubai
Banking institutes
Bank